Hassan Isse Jama  is a Somali politician and veteran. He served as the first Vice President of Somaliland and was one the founding members of the Somali National Movement.

Career
Hassan served in the  BBC Somali Service  as a broadcaster but was forced to relinquish his role at the BBC due to his SNM related activities. He also held senior positions in the SNM including Vice Chairman.

Hassan studied law at Queen Mary University in London and practiced as a lawyer.

In 2011, returned to political life after a 20 year absence and founded the Xaqsoor Party to compete in the 2012 Somaliland local elections, but failed to qualify and dissolved months after.

See also
Politics of Somaliland
Somali National Movement
Vice Presidents of Somaliland

References

Living people
People from Hargeisa
Somaliland politicians
Vice presidents of Somaliland
Year of birth missing (living people)